Botoșana is a commune located in Suceava County, Bukovina, northeastern Romania. It is composed of a single village, namely Botoșana. It also included Comănești and Humoreni villages until 2002, when they were split off to form the Comănești commune.

Natives 

 Gheorghe Flutur, politician

References 

Communes in Suceava County
Localities in Southern Bukovina